The Dean Delt-Air 250 was an American twin-seat amateur-built, delta wing light aircraft. Designed and built by Herbert Dean of Flint, Michigan, the aircraft was destroyed on its first flight and Dean was killed.

Design and development
The Delt-Air was a single-engined all-metal light aircraft powered by a  Lycoming O-360 engine mounted at the rear driving a pusher propeller. It had a tricycle landing gear and rear-hinged canopy for access to the tandem cockpit. Registered N6379T it was destroyed during its first fatal flight on 8 November 1961.

Specifications

References

Notes

1960s United States civil utility aircraft
Homebuilt aircraft
Delta-wing aircraft
Aircraft first flown in 1961
Pusher aircraft
Single-engined pusher aircraft
Tailless delta-wing aircraft